Bucculatrix dominatrix is a moth in the family Bucculatricidae. It is found in North America, where it has been recorded from coastal central California. It was described in 1997 by Daniel Z. Rubinoff and Kendall H. Osborne.

Adults have been recorded on wing from April to June.

The larvae feed on Baccharis pilularis.

References

Natural History Museum Lepidoptera generic names catalog

Bucculatricidae
Moths described in 1997
Moths of North America